The Simony Act 1588 (31 Eliz 1 c 6) is an Act of the Parliament of England.

The Act stipulates penalties for simony (the act of selling church offices and roles or sacred things), an offence under the ecclesiastical law of the Church of England.

, it remains largely in force in England and Wales.

This Act was partly in force in Great Britain at the end of 2010.

Under section 4, an unlawfully bestowed office can be declared void by the Crown, and the offender can be disabled from making future appointments and fined up to £1,000. Clergy are no longer required to make a declaration as to simony on ordination but offences are now likely to be dealt with as "misconduct" under the Clergy Discipline Measure 2003, r.8.

References

Bibliography
Lord Mackay of Clashfern (ed.) (2002) Halsbury's Laws of England, 4th ed., Vol.14, "Ecclesiastical Law", 832 'Penalties and disability on simony'
 — 1359 'Simony' (see also current updates)

1588 in law
Acts of the Parliament of England concerning religion
Acts of the Parliament of England still in force
Simony
Church of England legislation
1588 in England
1588 in Christianity